Torrijos is a Spanish municipality of Toledo province, in the autonomous community of Castile-La Mancha. Its surface is 17 km², with a density of 682.76 people/km². Torrijos is the center of the "comarca" of the same name.

The mayor of Torrijos is Anastasio Arevalillo Martín of the ruling PSOE.

See also 
 Torrijos railway station

References

Municipalities in the Province of Toledo